The 2017 Arena Football League season was the 30th season in the history of the Arena Football League (AFL). Prior to the start of the season, the league contracted to five teams. Due to this, for the first time since 1991, the league was not divided into conferences or divisions. The 14-game regular season began on April 7, 2017, when the two new teams, the Baltimore Brigade and the Washington Valor, faced off in the Verizon Center, and ended on August 5, 2017, when the Tampa Bay Storm lost against the Philadelphia Soul.

ArenaBowl XXX was held on August 26, 2017, at the Wells Fargo Center in Philadelphia, as the Soul repeated as champs by beating the Storm by a score of 44–40.

League business

Teams
On February 10, 2016, The Washington Post and radio station WTOP-FM first broke the story that Monumental Sports & Entertainment (Ted Leonsis, chairman) were "close to a deal" to bring a new expansion franchise to the Verizon Center.  On March 10, 2016, AFL commissioner Scott Butera announced that the deal was finalized and that the new Washington, D.C., team would begin play in 2017. On July 14, 2016, the team name was revealed as the Washington Valor. There was also talk for franchises to return to San Antonio and St. Louis as well as a potential new team for  Sacramento.  However, when the 2017 schedule was announced, there was no mention of any San Antonio, St. Louis, or Sacramento teams.

On October 12, 2016, the Orlando Predators announced they had left the league due to the reduced number of teams and other pending disagreements with the league. Hours later, the Jacksonville Sharks also announced they would be leaving the AFL and later joined the National Arena League. The next day, it was reported that the Arizona Rattlers were in the planning stages to also leave the AFL for the Indoor Football League for 2017. In the same report, it was stated the Los Angeles Kiss and Portland Steel had apparently folded after both teams failed to return calls or respond to inquiries into 2017 season ticket purchases. Later on October 13, the league held a teleconference with the remaining team owners and issued a statement the next morning declaring that the league would continue in the long-term, although the league did not expressly commit to playing in 2017 at that time.

On October 14, the AFL held a dispersal draft with the five remaining teams selecting players from the Jacksonville, Los Angeles, Orlando, and Portland rosters. The Rattlers then officially left the AFL for the IFL on October 17, leaving the AFL with four teams. They were the sixth AFL team to leave for the IFL since the 2010 relaunch. On November 14, the AFL announced that it had granted a second franchise to Washington Valor owner Ted Leonsis to be based out of Baltimore for the 2017 season bringing the league up to five teams. On January 25, after the announcement of the schedule, MSE announced that the team would be called the Baltimore Brigade.

Schedule and playoff changes

On January 5, 2017, the schedule was announced. The five teams played 14 games through 18 weeks, with four bye weeks for each team and no divisions. Each team played each other three or four times throughout the season. The postseason saw a structure change, with four teams advancing. The top seed hosted the fourth seed and the second seed hosted the third seed in a semifinal round, each match for a spot in ArenaBowl XXX on August 26.

Regular season standings

Playoffs

Semifinals 

All times listed are in EDT.

ArenaBowl XXX

Awards

Players of the week
The following were named the top performers during the 2017 season:

All-Arena team

Source:

Attendances

Source:

References